Columbia is an unincorporated community and census-designated place (CDP) located within Knowlton Township in Warren County, New Jersey, United States. While the community has existed for over a century, the CDP was created as part of the 2010 United States Census. As of the 2010 Census, the CDP's population was 229. The area is served as United States Postal Service ZIP Code 07832.

Geography
According to the United States Census Bureau, the CDP had a total area of 0.126 square miles (0.327 km2), including 0.100 square miles (0.258 km2) of land and 0.026 square miles (0.068 km2) of water (20.94%).

Demographics

Census 2010

Wineries
 Brook Hollow Winery

References

Census-designated places in Warren County, New Jersey
Knowlton Township, New Jersey
New Jersey populated places on the Delaware River